Rachel Berry is a fictional character from the television show Glee.

Rachel Berry may also refer to:

Rachel Berry (legislator)
Rachel Berry (figure skater) in 1999 United States Figure Skating Championships
Rachel Berry and her husband Richard, owners of Richard Berry, Jr., House (Springfield, Kentucky)